The effects of Hurricane Georges in Puerto Rico included $3 billion in damages and eight fatalities. Hurricane Georges was the first hurricane to cross the entire island since the San Ciprian Hurricane in 1932. Georges formed on September 15 as Tropical Depression Seven off the African coast. Georges strengthened into a Category 4-hurricane on September 19 as it made landfall in the Lesser Antilles. Georges made landfall on the island on September 21 as a Category 3-hurricane. Georges caused $3 billion (1998 USD, $4.5 billion 2017 USD) in damage to the island.

Background

Hurricane Georges began as a tropical wave that moved off the coast of Africa during mid-September 1998. Tracking westward, the wave spawned an area of low pressure two days later, which quickly strengthened into a tropical depression. On September 16, the depression was upgraded to Tropical Storm Georges, and to Hurricane Georges the next day.

Over the following five days, the hurricane tracked through the Greater Antilles, causing over 600 fatalities, mainly in the Dominican Republic and Haiti. By September 25, Georges entered the Gulf of Mexico as a Category 2 hurricane. Upon landfall, the hurricane's forward motion slowed to an eastward drift. Georges dissipated on October 1 near the Atlantic coast of Florida.

Preparations 
On September 19, a hurricane watch was issued for Puerto Rico. A day later on September 20, the watch was upgraded to a hurricane warning for the entire island. The warning was discontinued on September 22 at 1500 UTC. More than 1,600 people sought shelter in public buildings on Puerto Rico and the nearby United States Virgin Islands. Both areas declared a state of emergency and activated the United States National Guard for help. Puerto Rico's governor, Pedro Rosselló banned all liquor sales and ordered the Puerto Rico Police to open all the shelters throughout the island. Banks and schools closed and flights were canceled as Puerto Rico braced for the upcoming impact. More than 1,000 people left their homes for shelters in towns of San Juan, Arecibo and Mayagüez.

Impact 

Upon making landfall in Puerto Rico, Hurricane Georges brought 10 and 20-foot storm surges in succession. As the mountains' flooding drained off into every river in Puerto Rico and causing them to overflow. Three tornadoes were reported to possibly have occurred on Puerto Rico. One was detected just north of Puenta Este in Vieques. A second one was recorded in the Orocovis and Barranquitas general area at about 100 UTC. Doppler radar recorded a third tornado in the Jayuya area. No fatalities were reported on the island. Damages to the utility system was catastrophic. 96% of the electrical system was lost for 1.3 million people. Water and sewer service was lost to 75% of the island's population. Road damage totaled out to $21.995 million. Only 8.4% of the population lost telephone service.

The agricultural sector of Puerto Rico lost over 50% of its crops and 65% of its poultry. Equipment, agriculture and manufacturing losses amounted to $212.9 million a day. Damages to houses were catastrophic, with 28,005 houses completely destroyed; an additional 72,000 were partially destroyed. On the nearby island of Culebra, 74 houses were completely destroyed with 89 suffering partial damage. Schools received an estimated $20–25 million in damage. The total damage to the Puerto Rican economy was estimated at $1.907 billion.

The  in Arecibo collapsed during Hurricane Georges.

No deaths in Puerto Rico have been directly attributed to Hurricane Georges. Georges indirectly caused 8 deaths in Puerto Rico. A 28-year-old woman died from carbon monoxide poisoning after operating a gasoline-powered generator inside her home. Two others were hospitalized for the same issue. A Bayamón man was found dead from carbon monoxide poisoning after fumes entered his store. A mother and her three children were killed as a lit candle set their house on fire. The other two cases were due to accidents (head trauma and electrocution) while repairing storm damage. Total damages from the storm amounted to roughly $3 billion.

Aftermath 

The Church World Service donated 1,000 bed sheets, 200 light-weight blankets, 1,000 cotton blankets, 2,000 health/first aid kits, 500 kerosene lanterns, 6,000 vials of water purification tablets, 1,000 school kits, 350 layettes, 500 flashlights, 500 sets of batteries, and 1,000 air mattresses to the Puerto Rico Council of Churches and other organizations. Total value of the items reached over $100,000 (1998 USD). The Federal Emergency Management Agency donated a 50-generator power pack for the island on September 23. The United States Army Corps of Engineers purchased 1 million pounds of ice and gallons of water for distribution. The Army Corps also provided teams of emergency debris clearance and removal. New York Yankees manager George Steinbrenner donated $200,000 from the Yankee Foundation to the hardest-hit areas of Puerto Rico and the nearby Dominican Republic.

Federal and Commonwealth officials created a 5-year, $1.2 billion plan to build and replace homes destroyed by Georges. The money for this rebuilding process was to be funded by state and local governments and houses were not to be built in landslide-prone areas. FEMA also ordered that they be built stronger as Georges devastated houses made out of wood or corrugated metal. FEMA received more than 190,000 requests for aid and had given more than $65 million in aid checks.

Hurricane Georges caused catastrophic damage to the road system in Puerto Rico. The hurricane had affected over 7000 kilometers of roads and 2100 bridges throughout the island. Most of these effects were structural failure, signs, signal systems, and landslides. The Puerto Rico Department of Transportation and Public Works started an emergency response to clean up the roads. Over 230 teams cleaned up debris and installed four temporary bridges.

See also 

Effects of Hurricane Georges in the Dominican Republic
Effects of Hurricane Georges in the Lesser Antilles

References 

Georges Effects
Hurricane Georges
1998 in Puerto Rico
Georges